Geritola virginea, the black-wing epitola, is a butterfly in the family Lycaenidae. It is found in Sierra Leone, Ivory Coast, Ghana, southern Nigeria, Cameroon and the Central African Republic. The habitat consists of forests.

References

Butterflies described in 1904
Poritiinae